Jean-Patrick Nduwimana (born 9 May 1978) is a Burundian middle distance runner who specializes in the 800 metres.

In 2001 he won a silver medal at the Goodwill Games in Brisbane and a bronze at the IAAF Grand Prix Final. He competed at the Olympic Games in 2000 and 2004 without reaching the final.

His personal best is 1:42.81 minutes, achieved in August 2001 in Zürich. This is the current Burundian record. He also holds the Burundian 400 metres record with 46.32 seconds.

Competition record

External links

1978 births
Living people
Burundian male middle-distance runners
Athletes (track and field) at the 2000 Summer Olympics
Athletes (track and field) at the 2004 Summer Olympics
Olympic athletes of Burundi
World Athletics Championships athletes for Burundi
Goodwill Games medalists in athletics
Competitors at the 2001 Goodwill Games
20th-century Burundian people
21st-century Burundian people